American singer-songwriter Mariah Carey has recorded songs for fifteen studio albums, including a soundtrack and two Christmas albums, as well as two compilations, a greatest hits, a remix album and an extended play (EP). She has occasionally appeared as a featured artist on songs by other performers and she has also contributed vocals to multiple charitable releases.

After working as a backing vocalist for the American singer Brenda K. Starr, Carey signed with Columbia Records (a record label owned by Sony Music) in 1988 with the help of Starr and released her eponymous debut album in 1990. She co-wrote all of the ten songs, seven of which were with her writing partner Ben Margulies. Mariah Carey was followed by Emotions (1991) and MTV Unplugged (1992). From then on she released a series of critically acclaimed and commercially successful albums in nearly every year of the remaining decade, including Music Box (1993) and Daydream (1995), both of which are certified diamond by the Recording Industry Association of America (RIAA). After a relatively unsuccessful period with Glitter (2001) and Charmbracelet (2002), whereby Carey suffered a physical and mental breakdown in between the releases, she returned to prominence with the multi-platinum, number-one albums The Emancipation of Mimi (2005) and E=MC² (2008) and the critically acclaimed Caution (2018).

Carey has been noted for co-writing and producing all of her original material. Of her nineteen Billboard Hot 100 number-one singles in the United States – the most among soloists – she has written eighteen of them. For her sophomore release Emotions, Carey wrote all of the lyrics herself and co-composed the music with other collaborators, and is similarly credited for doing the same for the majority of the songs on Music Box, Daydream and Butterfly (1997). The singer has collaborated with a number of songwriters throughout her career, with many of the songs reaching number-one on the music charts around the world, including "Hero", "All I Want for Christmas Is You", "Fantasy", "Always Be My Baby", "Heartbreaker", "We Belong Together" and "Touch My Body". In 2017, Billboard listed "It's a Wrap", "Lead the Way", "There for Me", "The Roof (Back in Time)" and "Thank God I Found You" (Make It Last Remix) as Carey's top five most underappreciated songs.

Aside from writing and recording her own material, Carey has also recorded cover versions of other artist's songs at various points throughout her career. Her sixth number-one single, and her only one not to be self-penned, was a cover of the Jackson 5 song "I'll Be There", which features her background vocalist Trey Lorenz. Other covers include "Open Arms" by Journey, "Without You" by Badfinger, "Against All Odds (Take a Look at Me Now)" by Phil Collins, "Bringin' On the Heartbreak" by Def Leppard, "I Want to Know What Love Is" by Foreigner, and "One More Try" by George Michael. In 1998, she recorded a cover of "I Still Believe" by Starr as a thank you for helping her get into the industry. Carey has released two Christmas albums, Merry Christmas (1994) and its sequel Merry Christmas II You (2010), including the covers "Silent Night" and "O Holy Night" on the former and "The First Noel" and "Here Comes Santa Claus" on the latter.

Songs

Sample credits and notes

References

 
Carey, Mariah